Pat Chaffey (born April 19, 1967) is a former American football running back who played for the Atlanta Falcons in 1991 and for the New York Jets from 1992–1993. He played college football at Oregon State University, and played in 31 games over three seasons in the National Football League (NFL). He graduated from North Marion High School in Aurora, OR.

References

1967 births
Living people
Sportspeople from McMinnville, Oregon
Players of American football from Oregon
American football running backs
Oregon State Beavers football players
Atlanta Falcons players
New York Jets players